Ch'ŏngam-guyŏk is a district of the 7 kuyŏk that constitute Chongjin, North Hamgyong Province, North Korea.

The Chongam Revolutionary Site in Haebang-dong is associated with Kim Jong-suk. She met there with fellow guerilla fighters in November 1945 to further Kim Il-sung's political agenda.

Administrative divisions 
Chongam-guyok is divided into 21 neighbourhoods (tong) and 6 villages (ri).

References 

Districts of Chongjin